The men's triple jump, also known as the hop, step, and jump, was a track and field athletics event held as part of the Athletics at the 1912 Summer Olympics programme. The competition was held on Monday, July 15, 1912. Twenty athletes from eight nations competed. NOCs could enter up to 12 athletes. The event was won by Gustaf Lindblom of Sweden, the nation's first medal in the men's triple jump. Georg Åberg and Erik Almlöf also medaled for Sweden, completing a sweep—previously accomplished twice by the United States in 1900 and 1904.

Background

This was the fifth appearance of the event, which is one of 12 athletics events to have been held at every Summer Olympics. Four jumpers from 1908 returned: bronze medalist Edvard Larsen of Norway, fourth-place finisher Calvin Bricker of Canada, fifth-place finisher Platt Adams of the United States, and also-competed Juho Halme of Finland. The top jumpers in the world, the brothers Tim Ahearne (1908 Olympic gold medalist) and Dan Ahearn (who set the world record in 1911), were not present.

Austria made its first appearance in the event. The United States competed for the fifth time, having competed at each of the Games so far.

Competition format

The competition was described as two rounds at the time, but was more similar to the modern divided final. All athletes received three jumps initially. The top three after that received an additional three jumps to improve their distance, but the initial jumps would still count if no improvement was made.

Records

These were the standing world and Olympic records (in metres) prior to the 1912 Summer Olympics.

No new world or Olympic records were set during the competition.

Schedule

Results

References

Sources
 
 

Athletics at the 1912 Summer Olympics
Triple jump at the Olympics